Mark Alves (born 19 December 1956) is a former Australian rules footballer who played with Melbourne in the Victorian Football League (VFL). 

He is the younger brother of Stan Alves.

Notes

External links 		
		
		
		
		
		
		
1956 births
Living people
Australian rules footballers from Victoria (Australia)		
Melbourne Football Club players